Leucania punctosa is a species of moth of the family Noctuidae. It is found from Morocco to Libya, southern Europe, Turkey, Armenia, Israel, Lebanon, Jordan, the Sinai in Egypt, Iran, Iraq and Turkmenistan.

Technical description and variation

S. punctosa Tr. (25c). Forewing luteous grey; costa paler; a grey brown shade along median vein and outer margin; veins grey: lines finely zigzag, mostly broken up into linear points; a slightly elongated whitish spot at lower angle of cell on a grey cloud; hindwing white. Larva yellowish grey, paler at sides; dorsal line fine, white, black-edged; subdorsal blackish, interrupted, whitish-edged beneath; spiracles brown in a red ring, above a white line.

Biology
Adults are on wing from October to November. There is one generation per year.

The larvae feed on various Gramineae species.

References

External links
Hadeninae of Israel
Lepiforum.de

Leucania
Moths of Europe
Moths of Asia
Moths of the Middle East
Taxa named by Georg Friedrich Treitschke
Moths described in 1825